Fritz Grüneisen was a Swiss footballer. He played in three matches for the Switzerland national football team from 1929 to 1931. He was also part of Switzerland's squad for the football tournament at the 1928 Summer Olympics, but he did not play in any matches.

References

External links
 

Year of birth missing
Year of death missing
Swiss men's footballers
Switzerland international footballers
Place of birth missing
Association football goalkeepers
FC Nordstern Basel players